Leisure, pronounced lay-zher (LāZHer), is an unincorporated community in Duck Creek Township, Madison County, Indiana.

History
A post office was established at Leisure in 1888, and remained in operation until it was discontinued in 1903. The community was named after Civil War veteran and pioneer Nathan J. Leisure.

Geography

References

Unincorporated communities in Madison County, Indiana
Unincorporated communities in Indiana
Indianapolis metropolitan area